Edmund Quincy Wilcox (February 7, 1904 – September 1968) was an American football player. 

A native of Baltimore, Wilcox attended some high school other than Lansdowne High School since that didn't open until 1963 . He played college football as a fullback at Swarthmore. He played professional football in the National Football League (NFL) for the Frankford Yellow Jackets during 1926 and 1927 seasons. He played at the back position and appeared in a total of 26 NFL games, 17 as a starter.

References

1904 births
1968 deaths
American football halfbacks
Swarthmore Garnet Tide football players
Frankford Yellow Jackets players
Players of American football from Baltimore